Lloyd Scott, MBE (born 13 October 1961) is an English former professional football goalkeeper and now charity fundraiser, best known in the UK for his charity marathons. He is notable for competing in the 2002 London Marathon in a deep-sea diving costume. The diving suit he wore is now on display at the National Maritime Museum in Greenwich, London. The number he wore is still attached to the suit on display.

On 2 July 2012 the BBC reported that Scott, wearing a 130 lb (59 kg) diving suit, was the first person to complete the 2012 Olympic Marathon Course in a time of six days.

Football career
Scott played for Watford, Leyton Orient and Blackpool.

Charity challenges
After surviving leukaemia, Scott has raised more than £5 million for a number of charitable causes, through what he calls "alternative charity fundraising events", including the following:

 April 1989: London Marathon – Just three weeks before life saving bone marrow transplant for leukaemia
 April 1990: London Marathon – Less than a year after transplant to show there is 'life after leukaemia'.
 October 1992: Snowdonia Marathon – Britain's toughest marathon
 November 1993: Everest Marathon – Staged 18,000 feet up the world's highest peak
 August 1995: Abseiled down a giant piece the size of Blackpool Tower
 September 1995: Complete Olympic distance triathlon
 March 1996: Firewalk over burning coals
 April 1996: Completed London Marathon in polar expedition gear
 May 1996: Sahara Marathon des Sables – 150-mile ultra marathon carrying all equipment.
 Oct – Jan 96–97: Scott 2 the South Pole – Expedition to the South Pole
 March 1997: 125-mile Devizes to Westminster canoe marathon
 July 1997: Fastnet yacht race
 September 1997: Climbed Kilimanjaro on a llama
 July 1998: Completed 135-mile Death Valley ultra marathon in 140 degrees of heat
 April 1999: Expedition to the North Pole.
 Feb 2001: Climbed Aconcagua, Argentina (22,841 ft)
 October 2001: 168 km Jordan Desert Cup ultra marathon – dressed as Indiana Jones
 April 2002: London Marathon in deep-sea diving suit – Taking 5 days, 8 hours, 29 mins and 46 seconds to complete
 November 2002: New York City Marathon in deep-sea diving suit – again finishing on the sixth day
 June 2003: Edinburgh Marathon in deep-sea diving suit – this time taking 6 days 4 hours, 30 mins and 56 seconds
 August 2003: Completed the Marathon of Britain – 175-mile ultra marathon
 September 2003: Completed Great North Run in deep-sea diving suit
 October 2003: Completed the world's first underwater marathon in deep-sea diving suit in Loch Ness – taking 12 days
 Feb 2004: First person to watch a film underwater, watching 'Finding Nemo' DVD in tank at the London Aquarium
 July 2004: Sport Relief Challenge – walked to top of BT Tower London in deep-sea diving suit
 Oct–Dec 2004: Cycled penny-farthing across Australia – Perth to Sydney, nearly 3,000 miles taking 50 days
 May 2005: 'Swam' from John O'Groats to Land's End in swimming pool on back of a lorry, taking 12 days
 September 2005: Completed Great North Run in Apollo 17 spacesuit on bouncy stilts
 April 2006:  Completed London Marathon as St George in 100 lb suit of armour, pulling 200 lb dragon, taking over eight days. Helped Sir Steve Redgrave break world fundraising record of £1.8 million
 April 2007: Completed London Marathon as Indiana Jones – 'chased' (but really pulling) 350 lb boulder around course
 May 2007: Trekked the Inca trail to Machu Picchu
 April 2008: London Marathon as Iron Giant – 9 feet tall robot, weighing 70 lbs, on stilts taking 6 days
 April 2009: London Marathon as The Beatles (Sgt Pepper uniforms) in the Yellow Submarine
 July – Sept 2009: Land's End to John O'Groats walk with life size tyrannosaurus rex – 'T-Rex Treks' taking 72 days, raising £175,000 for Teenage Cancer Trust
 June 2010: World's deepest underground marathon, 12,000 feet down at bottom of world's deepest mine in, South Africa – severe heat and humidity over two miles underground
 April – May 2011: Magic Marathon – dragged around London Marathon as Brian the Snail from the Magic Roundabout, taking 27 days
 May – June 2012: Completed Diamond Jubilee Marathon in deep sea diving suit on behalf of The Queen Elizabeth Diamond Jubilee Trust, becoming the first person to complete London 2012 Olympic Marathon course.
 May 2014: Completed the Maldon mud race in a diving suit.

Lloyd is a Pro Dono Ambassador

Scott has been injured during some of his events. For example, he injured his shoulder during the underwater marathon when he fell off a  ledge while in the loch. After being awarded an MBE in 2005, Scott joked that the award should stand for "Mad, Bonkers and Eccentric".

References

External links
 "Marathon man erodes lead boots" – BBC News
 Lloyd Scott interview on his trek from Land's End to John O'Groats
 "Tyrannosaurus! TREKS!" – Blackpool Gazette
 Profile at The Old Boys Network

1961 births
Living people
Association football goalkeepers
English footballers
Leyton Orient F.C. players
Blackpool F.C. players
Watford F.C. players
Dagenham & Redbridge F.C. players
British male marathon runners
Members of the Order of the British Empire
Footballers from Rainham, London
Charity fundraisers (people)